Ulysses Silveira Guimarães ( October 6, 1916 – October 12, 1992) was a Brazilian politician and lawyer who played an important role in opposing the military dictatorship in Brazil and in the fight to restore democracy in the country. He died in a helicopter accident by the shore near Angra dos Reis, in the south of Rio de Janeiro state.

Biography

Childhood and youth
Ulysses Silveira Guimarães was born in the village of Itaqueri da Serra, today a district of Itirapina, which was then part of Rio Claro, São Paulo State. He had an active academic life, participating in the Centro Acadêmico XI de Agosto (August XI Academic Center) and exercising vice president of the União Nacional dos Estudantes. Guimarães has graduated in Law and Social Sciences, at the School of Law of University of São Paulo (USP).

Professional life 
He was a teacher for several years at the Mackenzie University School of Law, where he eventually became Professor of Public International Law. He taught Municipal Law at the Law Faculty of Itu, and Constitutional Law at the Law School of Bauru. He specialized in Tax Law. Ulysses Guimarães worked at Santos Futebol Clube, starting on January 10, 1941. In 1942, he was appointed chief executive of the club's offices in São Paulo, a position he took back in 1945. In 1944, he was elected vice president of the club.

He was elected state deputy for São Paulo, for Constituent Assembly of 1947, by the Social Democratic Party (PSD). Since then, Guimarães was elected for the role of federal deputy for the State for eleven consecutive terms from 1951 to 1995 (not having finished the last term).

Guimarães held the Ministry of Industry and Trade at the office of Tancredo Neves, during the short parliamentary experience in Brazil (1961-1962). He initially welcomed the military takeover of 1964, but soon moved to the opposition. With the introduction of bipartisanship (1965), he joined the Brazilian Democratic Movement, of which he would be vice president and then president. He was president of the Latin American Parliament from 1967 to 1970.

Struggle for political opening 
In 1973, he launched his symbolic "anticandidacy" to the presidency for the 1974 election as a form of repudiation of the military regime, having as running mate the journalist and former governor of Pernambuco, Barbosa Lima Sobrinho. It was the first time during the military era that the MDB even put up a candidate. At the time, the president was indirectly elected by a joint session of Congress. The military's official party, the National Renewal Alliance Party (ARENA), had such a massive majority in both chambers that ARENA's candidate could not possibly be defeated. As expected, Guimarães lost in a landslide to the military candidate, Ernesto Geisel, garnering only 76 votes.

On November 29, 1976, at the Plenary Tiradentes of the Legislative Assembly of São Paulo, he founded OPB - Order of Parliamentarians of Brazil, a class association without partisan, religious or social ties, of which he is patron. Ahead of the party, he has participated in all campaigns for a return to democracy, including the struggle for broad, general and unrestricted amnesty. With the end of bipartisanship (1979), the MDB became Brazilian Democratic Movement Party (PMDB), of which he would be national president.

Political activism 

Together with Tancredo Neves, Orestes Quércia and Franco Montoro, Guimarães led new campaigns by democratization such as direct elections, popularly known by the slogan: Diretas Já. Ulysses Guimarães was almost  the candidate for president of the Republic in 1985 by PMDB, when elections were held in the electoral college. The political  articulations of the era ultimately led to the election of a "mixed" ticket with Tancredo Neves as PMDB presidential candidate and José Sarney, ex-PDS/Frente Liberal, as running mate.

The Neves/Sarney ticket won in a landslide. However, Neves fell gravely ill in the weeks leading up to his inauguration, and it soon became apparent that he would be too sick to be sworn in as scheduled on March 15. Several politicians argued that Guimarães, who had been elected President of the Chamber of Deputies, should have ascended as acting president. They took the line that Sarney should be sworn in alongside Neves, as he had only been elected vice president by virtue of being Neves' running mate. However, Guimarães himself argued that Sarney should assume office as acting president, since the vice president's main duty was to stand in for the president when necessary. Accordingly, Sarney was sworn in as vice president, and immediately became acting president, formally ascending as president upon Neves' death on April 21.

Guimarães was President of the Chamber of Deputies in three periods (1956-1958, 1985-1987 and 1987–1989), chairing the National Constituent Assembly in 1987–1988. The new constitution, in which he was instrumental, was promulgated on October 5, 1988, and was by him called Citizen Constitution, by the social advances that incorporated in the text. Due to his great popularity, he ran for president for PMDB in the 1989 direct elections, won by Fernando Collor.

Death 

He died in a helicopter crash off the coast of Angra dos Reis, in Rio de Janeiro on October 12, 1992, with his wife D. Mora, former Senator Severo Gomes, his wife and the pilot. The body of Guimarães has never been found.

Written Works 
 Vida Exemplar de Prudente de Morais, 1940
 Navegar é preciso, Viver não é preciso, 1973
 Socialização do Direito, 1978
 Esperança e Mudança, 1982
 Tentativa, 1983
 Diretas Já, 1984
 PT Saudações, 1988
 Da Fé fiz Companheira, 1989
 Ou Mudamos ou seremos Mudados, 1991
 Parliamentarismo – Além de ser mais forte, substitui um regime fraco, fevereiro de 1992.

References

|-

|-

|-

1916 births
1992 deaths
People from São Paulo (state)
Social Democratic Party (Brazil, 1945–65) politicians
Brazilian Democratic Movement politicians
Presidents of the Chamber of Deputies (Brazil)
Members of the Chamber of Deputies (Brazil) from São Paulo
Members of the Legislative Assembly of São Paulo
Brazilian jurists
University of São Paulo alumni
Victims of aviation accidents or incidents in Brazil